Death Wolf are a Swedish horror punk and heavy metal band. They were originally formed as Devils Whorehouse and started as a Misfits/Samhain cover band.

Biography 
Devils Whorehouse were formed in 2000 as a Misfits/Samhain cover band but soon started to write own material.

In March 2011 they decided to change their original name and are now continuing under the name Death Wolf because "the music and philosophy behind the orchestra has outgrown its name". The name change was followed by a self-titled album released through now defunct label Regain Records

Musical style and lyrics 
The early Devils Whorehouse material is stylistically close to the bands Misfits and Samhain whom they originally covered. The name they adopted in 2011, Death Wolf, symbolises "the strength, dedication and will shown in its creations". The first album under the new name deals with "Northern end themes and death hymns". Their music still pays homage to Misfits and Samhain founder Glenn Danzig, though in a more subtle way than on early recordings, with "high speed metal punk" tracks like "Sudden Bloodletter" as well as doom tracks like "Rothenburg".

Band members

Current 
 Martin Gustafsson - vocals
 Morgan Håkansson - bass
 Hrafn - drums
 Makko - guitar

Former 
 Roger Svensson: bass
 Zwedda: vocals

Live musicians 
 Lars Broddesson: drums
 Jeff Tandy: bass
 Calle Larsson: drums

Discography
 2000 - The Howling (EP) (as Devils Whorehouse - Blooddawn Productions)
 2003 - Revelation Unorthodox (as Devils Whorehouse - Blooddawn Productions)
 2008 - Werewolf (EP) (as Devils Whorehouse - Blooddawn Productions and Regain Records)
 2009 - Blood & Ashes (as Devils Whorehouse - Blooddawn Productions and Regain Records)
 2011 - Death Wolf (Blooddawn Productions and Regain Records)
 2012 - Snake Mountain (Single) (Century Media Records)
 2013 - II: Black Armoured Death (Century Media Records)
 2014 - Liksjöns Drickare (Single) (Century Media Records)
 2014 - III: Östergötland (Century Media Records)
 2019 - IV: Come The Dark (Regain Records)

References

External links
 
 
 Encyclopaedia Metallum

Swedish punk rock groups
Swedish heavy metal musical groups
Horror punk groups
Musical groups established in 2000